Basis of Union may refer to:

Basis of Union (Uniting Church in Australia) (1977)
Basis of Union (Presbyterian Church of Australia) (1901)